Saint-Nicolas-de-Bourgueil (literally Saint-Nicolas of Bourgueil) is a commune in the Indre-et-Loire department in central France.

This village is in the Loire Valley, in the midst of many castles, such as Chenonceaux, Villandry, etc. The commune is home to a wine appellation, Saint-Nicolas-de-Bourgueil AOC.

Geography
Saint-Nicolas-de-Bourgueil is situated between Angers, Tours and Chinon.

History
The old ecclesia Sancti Nicolai, mentioned in 1208,was situated in the North-east of the present cemetery of Bourgueil.

In 1790–1794, Saint-Nicolas-de-Bourgueil annexed the former commune of La Taille. The current village centre of Saint-Nicolas-de-Bourgueil was built during the July Monarchy (1830-1848).

Population

Its inhabitants are called the Saint-nicolaisiens.

Personalities
Marie Dupin, a conquest of Pierre de Ronsard, lived in the Port Guyer (part of Saint-Nicolas-de-Bourgueil) all her life.

References

External links

 Domaine de Haut-de-la-Gardière, wine estate
 Postcards of the village

Communes of Indre-et-Loire